Wahkiakum County is a county located in the U.S. state of Washington. As of the 2020 census, the population was 4,422, making it the third-least populous county in Washington. The county seat and only incorporated town is Cathlamet. The county was formed out of Cowlitz County in April 1854 and is named for Chief Wahkiakum ("Tall Timber") of the Chinook, who is buried in the Pioneer Cemetery in Cathlamet.

The county operates the Wahkiakum County Ferry, which connects Cathlamet to Westport, Oregon, across the Columbia River.

Geography
It is the smallest county of Washington by total area and the third-smallest by land area, after San Juan County and Island County, which are mostly water by area.

Geographic features
Columbia River
Elochoman River
Grays River
Puget Island

State highways
 State Route 4
 State Route 409

Adjacent counties
Pacific County – northwest
Lewis County – north/northeast
Cowlitz County – east/southeast
Columbia County, Oregon – south/southeast
Clatsop County, Oregon – south/southwest

National protected area
Julia Butler Hansen National Wildlife Refuge (part)

Demographics

Wahkiakum County has the second lowest population of any county in Washington state. Its population of 4,422 is 0.2% the size of the population of Washington's largest county, King.

The county has the second highest divorce rate of any Washington county, behind Lincoln County.

2000 census
As of the census of 2000, there were 3,824 people, 1,553 households, and 1,108 families living in the county. The population density was 14 people per square mile (6/km2). There were 1,792 housing units at an average density of 7 per square mile (3/km2). The racial makeup of the county was 93.46% White, 0.26% Black or African American, 1.57% Native American, 0.47% Asian, 0.08% Pacific Islander, 1.65% from other races, and 2.51% from two or more races.  2.56% of the population were Hispanic or Latino of any race. 18.7% were of German, 13.1% Norwegian, 10.6% United States or American, 9.1% English, 7.7% Irish, 6.5% Swedish, and 5.9% Finnish ancestry. 96.7% spoke English and 2.5% Spanish as a first language.

There were 1,553 households, out of which 26.90% had children under the age of 18 living with them, 61.40% were married couples living together, 6.30% had a female householder with no husband present, and 28.60% were non-families. 24.40% of all households were made up of individuals, and 10.60% had someone living alone who was 65 years of age or older. The average household size was 2.42 and the average family size was 2.83.

In the county, the population was spread out, with 23.40% under the age of 18, 5.30% from 18 to 24, 22.20% from 25 to 44, 30.60% from 45 to 64, and 18.50% who were 65 years of age or older. The median age was 44 years. For every 100 females there were 100.10 males. For every 100 females age 18 and over, there were 98.10 males.

The median income for a household in the county was $39,444, and the median income for a family was $47,604. Males had a median income of $37,123 versus $27,938 for females. The per capita income for the county was $19,063. About 5.90% of families and 8.10% of the population were below the poverty line, including 11.00% of those under age 18 and 2.70% of those age 65 or over.

2010 census
As of the 2010 census, there were 3,978 people, 1,737 households, and 1,187 families living in the county. The racial makeup of the county was 94.0% white, 1.3% American Indian, 0.6% Asian, 0.3% black or African American, 0.2% Pacific islander, 0.7% from other races, and 3.1% from two or more races. Those of Hispanic or Latino origin made up 2.7% of the population. In terms of ancestry, 19.8% were Norwegian, 19.3% were German, 13.3% were English, 9.6% were American, 8.5% were Swedish, and 6.8% were Irish.

Of the 1,737 households, 21.9% had children under the age of 18 living with them, 57.2% were married couples living together, 6.2% had a female householder with no husband present, 31.7% were non-families, and 26.8% of all households were made up of individuals. The average household size was 2.26 and the average family size was 2.69. The median age was 52.3 years.

The median income for a household in the county was $40,372 and the median income for a family was $47,266. Males had a median income of $44,779 versus $36,111 for females. The per capita income for the county was $23,115. About 7.1% of families and 12.2% of the population were below the poverty line, including 14.5% of those under age 18 and 10.7% of those age 65 or over.

Politics
In the 2016 Presidential election, Donald Trump won the county over Hillary Clinton by a decisive margin – 55.3% to 34.3%. It is generally a swing county in presidential elections. Between 1932 and 1996, it voted Democratic all but twice, but since 2000 it has voted Republican all but once.

Communities

Town
Cathlamet (county seat)

Census-designated places

Altoona
Deep River
East Cathlamet
Grays River
Lower Elochoman
Puget Island
Rosburg
Skamokawa Valley
Upper Elochoman

Unincorporated communities
Brookfield
Eagle Cliff
Flandersville
Skamokawa
Waterford

Notable residents
Krist Novoselic, former bass player of the Seattle grunge band Nirvana
Robert Michael Pyle, lepidopterist and author
Hadley Caliman, jazz musician

See also
National Register of Historic Places listings in Wahkiakum County, Washington

References

External links
Wahkiakum County, official county site

 
1854 establishments in Washington Territory
Populated places established in 1854
Western Washington
Washington placenames of Native American origin